The 2008 Crawley Borough Council election took place on 1 May 2008 to elect members of Crawley Borough Council in West Sussex, England. One third of the council was up for election. The Conservative Party retained overall control of the council.

After the election, the composition of the council was:
Conservative 22
Labour 12
Liberal Democrats 3

Ward results

Bewbush

Broadfield North

Broadfield South

Gossops Green

Ifield

Langley Green

Maidenbower

Pound Hill North

Pound Hill South and Worth

Southgate

Three Bridges

Tilgate

West Green

References

2008 English local elections
2008
2000s in West Sussex